Yershov is a rural locality (a khutor) in Goncharovskoye Rural Settlement, Pallasovsky District, Volgograd Oblast, Russia. The population was 100 as of 2010. There are 4 streets.

Geography 
Yershov is located in steppe, on the Caspian Depression, 60 km southwest of Pallasovka (the district's administrative centre) by road. Gonchary is the nearest rural locality.

References 

Rural localities in Pallasovsky District